Maria Rita Rossa (born 19 April 1966) is an Italian politician. She is member of the Democratic Party. Maria was born in Alessandria, Italy. Maria is the daughter of Angelo Rossa, he already a member of the Italian Socialist Party, president of the Province of Alessandria and the Piedmont Regional Council in the 1980s. Maria was Mayor of Alessandria from 21 May 2012 to 26 June 2017 and president of the province from 14 October 2014 to 26 June 2017. Maria is married and has children.

References

External links 
 

Living people
1966 births
People from Alessandria
Democratic Party (Italy) politicians
21st-century Italian politicians
21st-century Italian women politicians
Mayors of Alessandria
Presidents of the Province of Alessandria